Naruyuki (written: 就行 or 成幸) is a masculine Japanese given name. Notable people with the name include:

, Japanese shogi player
, Japanese footballer

Japanese masculine given names